Cherry Pie Sison Picache (born May 27, 1970) is a Filipino actress who has starred television and in mainstream and independent films and has worked as a print and TV commercial model for  Palmolive, Camay, and Eskinol. Cherry Pie is notable for her antagonist roles in Hiram na Mukha as Rose Ponce, the evil and avaricious cousin of Alicia, Pangarap na Bituin as the scheming and domineering Alberta Tuazon and Iisa Pa Lamang as Isadora, the wicked and greedy wife of Victor Castellejos who kills many characters in that series. So far, Picache's Isadora character become one of the most iconic villains in the Philippine history due to her schemes, heartless and murderous attitude. After that, she played many kind-hearted mother roles in several television series.

Biography
She was born in 1970 to Ceferino M. Picache and Zenaida Vidor (née Sison) Picache. She attended St. Mary's College, Mo. Ignacia, Quezon City, St. Paul University Quezon City, and took up dentistry at Centro Escolar University. Picache made her television debut in the soap opera Familia Zaragoza aired on ABS-CBN in 1996, and received more projects from that network. She is currently a part of ABS-CBN management.

Personal life
Picache has a son, actor-athlete Antonio "Nio" Picache Tria, from her previous relationship.

In September 2014, Picache's mother, Zenaida was found dead after several stab wounds. Michael Flores is the suspect and is arrested for 40 years in prison.

Filmography

Television

Film

Awards and recognitions

International awards

Philippine awards

Note
 Shared with Entire Cast of Tanging Yaman.

References

External links

1970 births
Living people
Actresses from Manila
Filipino film actresses
Filipino television actresses
Filipino television presenters
Filipino women comedians
Filipino child actresses
ABS-CBN personalities
GMA Network personalities
Kapampangan people
Filipino people of Kapampangan descent
Centro Escolar University alumni
Filipino women television presenters